Mangualde is a former civil parish in the municipality of Mangualde, Portugal. In 2013, the parish merged into the new parish Mangualde, Mesquitela e Cunha Alta.

References

Former parishes of Mangualde